Cantando por un Sueño (Singing for a Dream) is a television contest produced by the Mexican television network Canal de las Estrellas which also aired on Univision in the United States.  As with its twin show Bailando por un sueño (Dancing for a Dream), celebrities are paired with common, everyday people. However, in Cantando por un Sueño, contestants have to sing, rather than dance to impress the panel of judges and win.  The panel of judges is made up of famous Latin American singers.
Prizes generally include costly interventions to help people in unfortunate situations including blindness, deafness, paralysis, mortal diseases, bankruptcy, etc.
Mexican singer Thalía is the "godmother" of this contest, and she sings the title song of the show too.
Cantando por un Sueño had three seasons of about seven episodes each and concluded in a final fourth season Called "Reyes de la Canción" (Song's Royalty) where the winners, runners-up and 3rd-place finishers of the first three seasons compete in a final showdown. (In the third season, 4th place went to "Reyes", because before being eliminated, they received the highest score).

On air

Hosts
 Adal Ramones
 Liza Echeverría
 Alessandra Rosaldo

Judges
 Yuri
 Ricardo Montaner
 Adrian Posse (1st and 2nd season)
 Susana Zabaleta (1st and 2nd season)
 Manuel Mijares (3rd season)
 Kiko Campos (3rd season)
Substitutes:
Amanda Miguel (3rd season) (substituting Yuri)

Contestants

Season 1

Season 2

Season 3
Rubén Cerda, actor/humorist (partnered with Leydi Diana) teacher: Margarita "la diosa de la cumbia" eliminated third
Luis Roberto Guzmán, actor (partnered with Argelia González) teacher: María Conchita Alonso eliminated second
Gustavo Munguía, humorist (partnered with Jacqueline Carrillo) teacher:Nelson Ned eliminated fourth
Maya, model (partnered with Everardo Ramírez)
    Everardo Ramirez, One of the finalists teacher: Napoleón eliminated  sixth
Alejandra Ávalos, actress (partnered with Moisés Sierra) teacher: Diego Verdaguer eliminated first
Arturo Peniche, actor/TV host (partnered with Norma Irene Carbajal) teacher: Karinna eliminated fifth
Chantal Andere, actress (partnered with Gerardo Urquiza) teacher: Ednita Nazario third place
Alan, actor (partnered with Lorena Schlebach) – Runner up teacher:  second place
Rocío Banquells, actress (partnered with Carlos García) – WINNER  teacher: Francisco Céspedes WINNER

Reyes De La Canción
Everyone against everyone; no teams were selected for this season. The final 3 groups from all previous seasons were featured in this season, "Kings/Queens of The Song".
Rocío Banquells
Carlos García
Alan
Lorena Schlebach
Chantal Andere
Gerardo Urquiza
Raquel Bigorra
Francisco Castillo – Male Winner
Patricio Borghetti
Samia Karima
Maya
Marco Antonio Gutierrez
Sheyla – Female Winner
Everardo Ramírez
Cipriano Hernández
Kika Edgar – Female Runner-Up
Raúl Juárez
Ernesto D'Alesio -Male Runner-Up
Ruth Vázquez

Argentine version: Cantando por un Sueño
For the Argentine version, visite Cantando por Sueño (Argentina)

External links
 Official Website
20 questions to Susana Zabaleta
    official website in the USA by Univision
    Everardo Ramirez, One of the finalists

Mexican reality television series
Las Estrellas original programming
Singing talent shows